The David Keith Mansion and Carriage House, at 529 East South Temple Street in Salt Lake City, Utah, United States, was built during 1898–1900.  It was designed by architect Frederick Albert Hale.  Keith lived in the home until 1916 when it was sold, and died in 1918.  Among other activities, Keith financed and published The Salt Lake Tribune.

The property was listed on the National Register of Historic Places in 1971.

See also
 
 National Register of Historic Places listings in Salt Lake City

References

External links
 
 
 

Houses completed in 1900
Houses in Salt Lake City
Houses on the National Register of Historic Places in Utah
Historic American Buildings Survey in Utah
National Register of Historic Places in Salt Lake City